Sandim, Olival, Lever e Crestuma is a civil parish in the municipality of Vila Nova de Gaia, Portugal. It was formed in 2013 by the merger of the former parishes Sandim, Olival, Lever and Crestuma. The population in 2011 was 17,168, in an area of 34.16 km².

References

Freguesias of Vila Nova de Gaia